All I Really Want for Christmas is the second Christmas album and thirteenth studio album by Steven Curtis Chapman, released on September 27, 2005. The album includes traditional holiday favorites such as "Go Tell It on the Mountain" and "Silver Bells", as well as some of Chapman's own Christmas songs, some of which had appeared on his previous Christmas albums.

Chapman's adopted daughter, Shaohannah, appears with her father on the album cover. On the first track, she reads the passage of the Nativity of Jesus (Luke 2:7-14) with the music of "The Night Before Christmas" (track 13) in the background.

Track listing

Credits 

 Steven Curtis Chapman – producer, lead vocals, piano (1, 13), acoustic guitar (2, 4, 5, 7, 10), electric guitar (2, 4, 5, 10), programming (2), mandolin (4), string arrangement (4, 13), backing vocals (5, 10)
 Ed Cash – producer (1, 2, 4, 5, 7, 10, 13, 14), audio recording, audio recording backing vocals (2, 4), electric guitar (2), percussion (4, 5, 10), string arrangement (4, 13), programming (5, 7), acoustic guitar (7)
 Brown Bannister – producer (3, 6, 8, 9, 11, 12)
 Ed's, Franklin, Tennessee – recording location
 Stephan Sharp – recording assistant
 East Iris Recording Studios, Nashville, Tennessee – recording location
 David Leonard – mixing (1, 5, 7, 10, 13, 14)
 J.R. McNeely – mixing at The Sound Kitchen, Franklin, Tennessee (2, 4)
 Matt Weeks – mixing assistant
 Shawn Pelton – drums (2, 4, 5, 7, 10), programming (2, 4, 10)
 Craig Young – bass (2, 4, 5, 10)
 Byron House – bass (7, 13)
 Ben Shive – keyboards (1, 2, 4, 5, 7, 10), accordion (7)
 Adam Lester – electric guitar (2, 4, 5, 7, 10)
 Jerry Douglas – dobro (7)
 Vince Gill – backing vocals (7)
 Blair Masters – string arrangement (2, 4, 7, 13)
 Strings (2, 4, 7, 13)
 Kristin Wilkinson – viola
 Monisa Angell – viola
 David Davidson – violin
 David Angell – violin
 Conni Ellisor – violin
 Pam Sixfin – violin
 Anthony LaMarchia – cello
 Brad O'Donnell – executive producer
 Bob Ludwig – mastering at Gateway Mastering, Portland, Maine
 Kristin Barlowe – photography
 Megan Thompson – grooming
 Joseph Cassell – wardrobe
 Jan Cook – creative direction
 Tim Frank – photo art direction
 Andy Norris Design – package design

References

External links 
 Album information

Steven Curtis Chapman albums
2005 Christmas albums
Christmas albums by American artists
Gospel Christmas albums